Kodjoviakope is a neighborhood of Lomé is on the western side of the city, bounded by the Route Circulaire and the Togo-Ghana border. It is known as one of the city's opposition strongholds. Landmarks in the neighborhood include the Lycée Francais de Lomé, the American International School, the Peace Corps office and Philipats, a popular restaurant.

Neighborhoods of Lomé
Ghana–Togo border crossings